Mikrokastro is a village and a community of the Voio municipality. Before the 2011 local government reform it was part of the municipality of Siatista, of which it was a municipal district. The 2011 census recorded 446 inhabitants in the community.

References

Populated places in Kozani (regional unit)
Siatista